Café Restaurant Residenz is a classical Viennese coffee house which is located in the eastern wing of Schloss Schönbrunn in the 13th Viennese district.

History
During the emperor’s time, the rooms of the café were more of a “police kitchen”. The place was used to provide the guards of Schloss Schönbrunn with food. In 1948, the guards were granted permission to use the place as a restaurant; it was leased several times later on.

The café has been run by the Querfeld family since 1998. Its name, “Café Restaurant Residenz”, refers to emperor Franz Joseph I, who declared Schloss Schönbrunn his main residence.

Details

Strudel Show
The daily strudel show is held in the Schaubackstube (bakery) underneath the Café Residenz every full hour. After the 20-minute show, every participant receives the “Original Viennese Apple Strudel Recipe”.

Apple Strudel Seminar
The apple strudel seminar is also organized in the bakehouse of Café Residenz. Under the guidance of an experienced pastry chef, each participant of the seminar creates his or her own apple strudel and receives a diploma including the original recipe as a reward.

Trivia 
Café Residenz can also be used for punch welcomes on the terrace, buffets, Christmas parties or dinners for up to 300 people. The piano is played in the Great Coffeehouse Saloon every Saturday and Sunday from 2 until 4 pm.

See also
 List of restaurants in Vienna

References

Literature 
 Hans Veigl: Wiener Kaffeehausführer. Kremayr und Scheriau, Wien 2001, .
 Stadtbekannt.at: Kaffee in Wien. Holzbaum Verlag, Wien 2014, .

External links 
 Café Restaurant Residenz Website

Coffeehouses and cafés in Vienna